The following is a list of clubs who have played in the Nemzeti Bajnokság I football league at any time since its formation in 1901.

Key

Coloumns

Rows

The chart contains the 2013-14 season, too.

List of clubs

Notes
 Note 1: until 1950 Újpest
 Note 2: until 1950 Kispest
 Note 3: until 1924 Erzsébetfalva, between 1924 and 1932 Pesterzsébet
 Note 4: until 1950 Soroksár
 Note 5: until 1950 Csepel
 Note 6: until 1950 Diósgyőr
 Note 7: until 1950 Pestszentlőrinc 
 Note 8: until 1950 Budafok
 Note 9: until 1950 Pereces
 Note 10: until 1950 Rákospalota
 Note 11: until 1961 Sztálinváros
Notes 2
Ungvári AC played in the 1944-45 Nemzeti Bajnokság I season but the championship was interrupted due to the World War II.

Most seasons 
The following clubs, 109 in total, have participated in the Hungarian League since its inception in 1901 until the 2018–19 season.

As of 30 June 2020.
 117 seasons: Ferencváros
 115 seasons: Újpest
 109 seasons: MTK Budapest
 105 seasons: Budapest Honvéd
 89 seasons: Vasas Budapest
 70 seasons: Győr
 63 seasons: Szombathely
 55 seasons: Diósgyőr
 53 seasons: Fehérvár
 51 seasons: Csepel, Pécs
 47 seasons: Debrecen
 44 seasons: Tatabánya
 38 seasons: Salgótarjáni BTC
 37 seasons: Zalaegerszeg
 28 seasons: 33 FC
 27 seasons: Békéscsaba Előre
 25 seasons: III. Kerületi TVE
 24 seasons: Szeged SC, Törekvés SE
 22 seasons: Dorogi FC, Szegedi Petőfi
 21 seasons: Nemzeti SC
 20 seasons: BFC Siófok, Budapesti TC, Dunaferr SE
 17 seasons: Magyar AC
 16 seasons: Kaposvári Rákóczi FC
 15 seasons: Paksi FC
 14 seasons: Gamma FC, Nyíregyháza Spartacus FC, Vác FC
 13 seasons: Bocskai FC, Budapesti AK, Terézvárosi TC
 12 seasons: Komlói Bányász SK
 10 seasons: Budapesti VSC, Elektromos SE, Rákospalotai EAC, Szolnoki MÁV FC, Vörös Lobogó SorTex
 8 seasons: FC Sopron, Lombard Pápa Termál FC, Puskás Akadémia FC
 7 seasons: Attila FC, Budapesti Postás SE, Kecskeméti TE
 6 seasons: Egri FC, Phöbus FC, Somogy FC
 5 seasons: Magyar Úszó Egyesület, Műegyetemi AFC, Sabaria FC, Veszprém FC, VAC, Mezőkövesdi SE, VM Egyetértés SK1
 4 seasons: BKV Előre SC, Budapesti MÁVAG SK,  Nagykanizsai Olajbányász SE, Ózdi Kohász SE, Stadler FC, Szentlőrinci AC
 3 seasons: Erzsébeti Spartacus MTK LE, MOGÜRT, Kisvárda, Kolozsvári AC (now ), Nagyváradi AC (now ), Pécsi VSK, Székesfehérvári MÁV Előre SC, Taxisok, Tipográfia TE, Újvidéki AC (now ), Vasas Izzó MTE, Zuglói AC
 2 seasons: VII. Kerületi SC, Budafoki MTE, Budapesti EAC, Budapesti SC, Gázszer FC2, Gyirmót FC, Pécs-Baranya FC, Soproni LC, Szegedi Honvéd SE, Szegedi VSE, Újpesti Törekvés SE, Zuglói SE
 1 season: Balmazújvárosi FC, Dózsa MaDISz, Bőripari DSE, Dunaújváros PASE, Erzsébetfalvi TC, Fővárosi TK, Ganz-MÁVAG SE, Goldberger SE, Herminamezei AC, Kassai AC (now ), Kistext,  Kőbányai Barátság, Lampart FC, Miskolci VSC, Perecesi TK, Szeged LC, Szolnoki Légierő SK, Testvériség SE, Tiszakécske FC, Tokodi Üveggyári SC, Újpesti MTE
 0 season: Ungvári AC3 (now )

Notes: The teams in bold are competing in the 2019–20 season of the Hungarian League.

1 VM Egyetértés SK in the 1974–75 season after the merger with MTK Budapest FC played as MTK-VM.
2 Gázszer FC sold the license for the spring round in the 1999–2000 season for PMFC.
3 Ungvári AC made his debut in the 1944–45 season, after 3 matches with 0 point club occupied the last 16th place, after which the championships were discontinued due to Second world war.

By city
Correct as of 5 June 2016.

See also
 Nemzeti Bajnokság I
 List of Nemzeti Bajnokság I managers
 List of Nemzeti Bajnoksag I stadiums

References

Nemzeti Bajnokság I